Smangaliso Mkhatshwa (born 1939) is a Catholic priest.  He later became a member of the first post-apartheid parliament (1994) and then mayor of the City of Tshwane Metropolitan Municipality. He was succeeded as mayor in 2005 by Gwen Ramokgopa.

History 
Mkhatshwa was arrested under the Internal Security Act after the Soweto uprisings (1976) and detained for four months. In 1977 he was served with a five-year banning order, which restricted his movements to the Pretoria magisterial district. In October 1983 he was arrested in the Ciskei region for subversion and inciting public violence, but released after a not guilty verdict in March 1984. In September 1986 he was arrested under emergency regulations in the Transkei region.

He described his experience as follows:

See also 
 1977 in South Africa

References 
 African National Congress. n.d. Smangaliso Mkhatshwa, ANC Metro Mayor Candidate – Pretoria.
 ABC Radio National, Australia. 2004. "The Mayor of Pretoria: Catholic priest Smangaliso Mkhatshwa." Transcript of The Religion Report, 9 June.

1939 births
Roman Catholic anti-apartheid activists
Living people
South African Roman Catholic priests
South African prisoners and detainees
Mayors of Pretoria
Members of the Order of Luthuli